Cornelis Johannes den Held (born 19 July 1883 in Rotterdam, died 12 September 1962 in Rotterdam) was a Dutch athlete, who competed at the 1908 Summer Olympics in London. He was born and died in Rotterdam, South Holland.

In the 200 metres, Den Held took fourth place in his first round heat and did not advance to the semifinals.  He also competed in the 400 metres, placing second in his two-man preliminary heat to not advance in that event either.

References

Sources

External links
 Dutch Olympic Committee

1883 births
1962 deaths
Dutch male sprinters
Olympic athletes of the Netherlands
Athletes (track and field) at the 1908 Summer Olympics
Athletes from Rotterdam